Lice is a mountain in the Prokletije range in western Kosovo. Lice reaches a height of 1,799m above sea level. The mountain borders the Rugova Canyon in the south and the village of Kućište and the Pecka Bistrica in the east.

Mountains of Kosovo
Accursed Mountains